The iPASS (Chinese: 一卡通) is a contactless smartcard operated by the iPASS Corporation. Starting from February 13, 2017, both EasyCard and iPASS in Taiwan are accepted for virtually all public transport including Kaohsiung Metro, Taipei Metro, buses and TRA. It also serves as an electronic wallet. It is available for purchase at all Kaohsiung and Taipei metro stations, and some convenience stores.

History 
The iPASS was originally operated by KRTC. It was released in 2007 and began to operate in 2008 along with the opening of KMRT. In 2014, the operation of iPASS was transferred to iPASS Corporation.

Scope of usage 
As of 1 September 2015, the scope of usage is:
 Entire Kaohsiung Metro and Taipei Metro system
 Most buses island-wide that don't run on freeways. See Full list of companies
 TRA: Yilan, Western, Pingxi, Shen'ao, Liujia, Neiwan, Jiji, and Shalun Lines
 All counties' public rental bikes
 Ferries in Kaohsiung operated by Kaohsiung City Shipping Co., Ltd.
 Parking lots. Full list
 Shops. Full list

Types of cards 
 Adult: 15% discount for Kaohsiung Metro, and 20% discount for Taipei Metro. May apply for 1~2 day pass.
 Student/Student ID Pass: 25% discount for Kaohsiung Metro, and 20% discount for Taipei Metro. NT$2 discount for buses in Kaohsiung per section.
 Senior/Disabled: 50% discount for KMRT. May take buses in Kaohsiung free of charge.
 Partner of Disabled: Same discount as Disabled cards when accompanying the disabled for KMRT. NT$2 discount for buses in Kaohsiung per section.
 iPASS Credit Card: Issued by banks. Same as Adult, but is capable of adding value automatically.
 Special cards: Same as Adult or Student but with unique appearances, most commonly associated with events. Limited availability.
Adult and Student cards cost NT$100.

Availability 
As of 1 September 2015, the Adult card is sold at:
 All Kaohsiung and Taipei metro stations
 OK convenience stores
 Hi-life convenience stores
 FamilyMart convenience stores
 7-11 convenience stores
 Some Pingtung bus stations
 Tainan bus station at TRA Tainan station.

Usage 
The iPASS is a contactless card. Simply holding the card in the vicinity of a scanner would complete the transaction. As of September 2015, the locations that provide add-value services are as follows:
 All Kaohsiung and Taipei metro stations
 FamilyMart in Taiwan
 OK in Taiwan
 7-Eleven in Taiwan
 Hi-Life in Taiwan
 TRA stations where it can be used
 Some Pingtung bus stations
 Kaohsiung City Hall

Contactless smart cards
Kaohsiung Metro
Fare collection systems in Taiwan